Fabiana Karla Souza Simões Barbosa (born 30 October 1975) is a Brazilian actress, writer, television presenter and comedian, best known for her work on the Globo sketch comedy series Zorra Total and Escolinha do Professor Raimundo.

Filmography

References

External links

 Official website
 

1975 births
Living people
Actresses from Recife
Brazilian television actresses
Brazilian film actresses
Brazilian telenovela actresses